These are the 1968 Five Nations Championship squads:

England

 Peter Bell
 Terence Brooke
 Mike Coulman
 John Finlan
 David Gay
 Bob Hiller
 Brian Keen
 Peter Larter
 Bob Lloyd
 Colin McFadyean (c.)
 Jim Parsons
 Roger Pickering
 Derek Prout
 John Pullin
 Bill Redwood
 Keith Savage
 Rod Webb
 Bryan West
 Mike Weston (c.)*

*captain in the last game

France

Head coach: Jean Prat

 André Abadie
 Jean-Marie Bonal
 Jean-Michel Cabanier
 Guy Camberabero
 Lilian Camberabero
 André Campaes
 Christian Carrère (c.)
 Elie Cester
 Benoît Dauga
 Claude Dourthe
 Bernard Duprat
 Jean Gachassin
 Michel Greffe
 Arnaldo Gruarin
 Claude Lacaze
 Michel Lasserre
 Jean-Pierre Lux
 Jo Maso
 Jean-Henri Mir
 Jean-Claude Noble
 Alain Plantefol
 Jean-Joseph Rupert
 Jean Salut
 Walter Spanghero
 Jean Trillo
 Pierre Villepreux
 Michel Yachvili

Ireland

 Aidan Brady
 Barry Bresnihan
 Mick Doyle
 Thomas Doyle
 Alan Duggan
 Mike Gibson
 Ken Goodall
 Mike Hipwell
 Ken Kennedy
 Tom Kiernan (c.)
 Willie John McBride
 Billy McCombe
 Syd Millar
 Mick Molloy
 Brian O'Brien
 Philo O'Callaghan
 John Quirke
 Robert Scott
 Brian Sherry

Scotland

 Rodger Arneil
 Alasdair Boyle
 Sandy Carmichael
 David Chisholm
 Gordon Connell
 Derek Deans
 Tommy Elliott
 Pringle Fisher (c.)
 John Frame
 Derrick Grant
 Alec Hastie
 Sandy Hinshelwood
 Charlie Hodgson
 Hamish Keith
 Frank Laidlaw
 Ian McCrae
 Alastair McHarg
 George Mitchell
 Ian Robertson
 David Rollo
 Peter Stagg
 Norm Suddon
 Jim Telfer (c.)*
 Jock Turner
 Stewart Wilson

*captain in the last game

Wales

 Gerald Davies
 John Dawes (c.)**
 Gareth Edwards (c.)*
 Norman Gale (c.)
 Tony Gray
 Boyo James
 Keith Jarrett
 Barry John
 Ian Jones
 Keri Jones
 Ron Jones
 John Lloyd
 Billy Mainwaring
 Dai Morris
 John O'Shea
 Billy Raybould
 Doug Rees
 Maurice Richards
 Delme Thomas
 Bobby Wanbon
 Stuart Watkins
 Paul Wheeler
 Denzil Williams
 Max Wiltshire
 Jeff Young

*captain in the second and fourth games
**captain in the third game

External links
1968 Five Nations Championship at ESPN

Six Nations Championship squads